Tybalmia pupillata is a species of beetle in the family Cerambycidae. It was described by Francis Polkinghorne Pascoe in 1859. It is known from Brazil, Colombia, Ecuador, Guyana, French Guiana, Peru and Suriname.

References

Onciderini
Beetles described in 1859